The International Mountain Bicycling Association-Southern Off-Road Bicycle Association (IMBA-SORBA) is an advocacy organization for mountain biking in the Southeastern United States. IMBA-SORBA is a regional division of International Mountain Bicycling Association, managed by an Executive Director and a Board of Directors. The Board of Directors is composed of an elected Executive Board, plus one representative from each chapter (the Chapter President).  The organization has over 5000 members.

Chapters
Members of the Southern Off-Road Bicycle Association are organized into local chapters in Alabama, Florida, Georgia, Mississippi, North Carolina, South Carolina, and Tennessee. As of 2015 the IMBA-SORBA has 42 chapters, with the Florida Mudcutters from Fort Myers, FL being added on November 14, 2015.

SORBA Orlando

The SORBA Orlando chapter maintains several trails at the Orlando Mountain Bike Park.

West Georgia
SORBA West Georgia operates in Cobb, Douglas, and Paulding Counties.  They operate trails at places including Allatoona Creek, Mount Tabor and the Clinton Nature Preserve.

SORBA-Chattanooga
The Chattanooga Chapter of SORBA (SORBA-Chattanooga) serves the interests of off-road cyclists in Chattanooga, Tennessee and the surrounding area of Southeast Tennessee.  SORBA-Chattanooga works with land managers and policy makers to develop fair and responsible policies governing the use of public lands.  The chapter's members have donated thousands of volunteer hours constructing and maintaining mountain bike accessible trails.  In 2005, SORBA-Chattanooga was awarded a Certificate of Appreciation by the United States Department of Agriculture for its active participation in the volunteer trail maintenance program of the Ocoee/Hiwassee District of the Cherokee National Forest.  More recently, SORBA-Chattanooga volunteers partnered with the Tennessee Valley Authority to construct trails on Raccoon Mountain.  Over  of trail have already been constructed and opened the public in this on-going project.  SORBA-Chattanooga volunteers have also completed trail expansion and maintenance projects at Booker T. Washington State Park and Harrison Bay State Park and are currently pursuing additional trail opportunities in Hamilton County and Marion County.

SORBA Woodstock
The Southern Off-Road Bicycle Association, Woodstock, GA Chapter (SORBA-W), was formed in March, 2000, by a group of local mountain bikers. SORBA-W was formed in part due to the closure of trails at Boling Park in Canton, GA to off-road cycling. With the mission to preserve, protect, and educate the community, SORBA-W's primary focus has been advocacy, mountain bike trail development, and trail maintenance in Cherokee County. As an extension of the main SORBA/IMBA organization, SORBA-W also assists with rides, festivals, and the advancement of off-road cycling throughout the southeastern United States.

Currently SORBA-Woodstock has relationships with local land managers such as the City of Woodstock, City of Canton, Cherokee Recreation and Parks Authority, Department of Natural Resources, Boy Scouts of America, Cherokee County Water Authority, and the United States Army Corps of Engineers, Allatoona. These relationships provide mountain bikers with opportunities for trail access while protecting the future of existing trails. SORBA-W's primary role is to organize volunteer workers to perform trail layout, design, construction, and maintenance at Blankets Creek and Taylor Randahl Memorial Mountain Bike Trails. SORBA Woodstock's leadership is made up solely of volunteers.

The Blankets Creek Mountain Bike Trail System in Cherokee County on Sixes Road ( I-575 exit 11), is composed of six trails: Mosquito Flats (Beginner), Mosquito Bite (Beginner plus), Dwelling Loop (Intermediate), South Loop (Advanced) Van Michael Trail (Advanced) and Quehl Holler (Expert Downhill). The Dwelling Loop was opened on June 3, 2000. The South Loop and Mosquito Flats were opened in the fall of 2003, Mosquito Bite and Van Michael Trail in June 2008 and the newest trail Quehl Holler in 2010.

Taylor Randahl Memorial Mountain Bike Trails, located just east of Blankets in Olde Rope Mill Park is composed of two trails: Explorer (Beginner and Beginner +) and Avalanche (Intermediate). Avalanche opened in 2010 and Explorer in 2011.

RAMBO
The Southern Off-Road Bicycle Association, Roswell/Alpharetta, GA Chapter (RAMBO) maintains trails in the Roswell / Alpharetta, GA area.  RAMBO is short for Roswell, Alpharetta Mountain Bike Organization, an association of mountain bikers located in the North Atlanta, and a chapter of IMBA/SORBA (Intl Mountain Bike Association/Southern Off Road Bicycle Association).

The Big Creek Trail System in Fulton County on Old Alabama Road (400 exit 7), is composed of numerous trails from Beginner (Green) to Advanced (Hurts so Good) and a Free Ride Area.  The Big Creek Trail System is run in affiliation with the City of Roswell, who owns the land.

TORC
The Triangle Off-Road Cyclists (TORC) is a volunteer organization dedicated to ensuring the future of mountain biking in the Triangle area of North Carolina through the promotion of responsible riding, establishment and maintenance of mountain biking trails, and preservation of North Carolina's natural resources.

Tallahassee Mountain Bike Association
TMBA is the local club of the International Mountain Bicycling Association (IMBA) and its regional partner, the Southern Off-Road Bicycle Association (SORBA). TMBA supports SORBA's mission to promote land access, trail preservation, and new trail development in Leon County and surrounding areas.

TMBA has a close working relationship with the City of Tallahassee who is the land manager for many of the trails in the area, such as Redbug, Tom Brown Park, and Lafayette Heritage Trail Park.  TMBA has also partnered with Maclay Gardens State Park to build single track on the Lake Overstreet side of the park.  Mountain Bikers know these trails as Silk and Cambodia, but are officially called the Southern and Northern Connector trails.

Munson Hills Off-Road Bike Trail, along with Twilight Trail, is a popular trail system with TMBA members. Within the Appalachicola National Forest, the trailhead shares parking and facilities with The St. Marks Trail.

Upstate SORBA
Upstate SORBA is a chapter of IMBA/SORBA for the Upstate Region of South Carolina. Upstate SORBA works with Greenville County Rec to maintain trails at various county parks and organize, promote, and staff bicycle related events in the greater Greenville SC area. In May 2014 Upstate SORBA in conjunction with Greenville Rec, Greater Greenville Parks Foundation Park Heroes, and the JFA Foundation, completed work on a new 6 mile multi-use trail at Pleasant Ridge County Park in Marietta, SC.

West Alabama Mountain Biking Association
he West Alabama Mountain Biking Association (WAMBA) is a chapter of IMBA/SORBA for the Tuscaloosa Region in Alabama. WAMBA works with the Tuscaloosa Park and Recreation Authority (PARA) to build and maintain trails at Munny-Sokol Park and Hurricane Creek Park and Alabama State Parks to build and maintain the trails at Lake Lurleen State Park. More than 40 miles of trails are maintained by volunteers from WAMBA.

Projects

In 2018 the Nantahala chapter entered into a partnership with the Cherokee tribe and the town of Sylva to create the highest-elevation mountain bike trail on the East Coast on 912 acres near Sylva.
In 2021, SORBA provided $75,000 for construction of the Rocky Face Trail near Dalton, Georgia
Over a four year period, the Middle Tennessee Chapter of SORBA helped create the Watkins Park pump track in North Nashville, the first urban bike park in Nashville.
In 2021, a chapter of SORBA known as the Northwest North Carolina Mountain Bike Alliance began the Mortimer Trails Project near Boone, North Carolina. The project includes a 10 mile trail, and plans to both replace and augment a current system of "pirate trails" in the area at a cost of $300,000.

References

External links 

Mountain biking teams and clubs in the United States